Fiddler's Green was an expeditionary fire base in Afghanistan  built by the United States Marine Corps. It was located off Route 605 in Nawa-I-Barakzayi District of Helmand Province.  It was originally built by the 3d Battalion, 11th Marines in 2009 for Operation Strike of the Sword.

See also
History of the United States Marine Corps
Fiddler's Green
List of United States Marine Corps installations
List of ISAF installations in Afghanistan

References

Buildings and structures in Helmand Province
Military installations of the United States in Afghanistan
Fiddler's Green
United States Marine Corps in the War in Afghanistan (2001–2021)